The Changed Man is a 1998 Iranian romantic comedy directed by Mohammad Reza Honarmand.

Plot
Khosro Paziresh, the inventor of a magical washing powder, goes to a company to sell his invention but he falls down the elevator and gets transferred to a hospital. Darioosh Jam, the CEO of the company, dies from a stroke after finding out that his company is bankrupt and he too gets transferred to the same hospital. The transplant team in the hospital, transplant Khosro's brain in Darioosh's body and Khosro stays alive in the CEO's body.

Cast
Parviz Parastui
Fatemeh Motamed-Arya
Afsaneh Bayegan
Zohreh Mojabi
Mahmud Pakniyat
Reza Shafiei Jam

References

External links
The Changed Man

1998 films
1990s Persian-language films
1998 romantic comedy films
Iranian romantic comedy films